Goodyera oblongifolia is a species of orchid known by the common names western rattlesnake plantain and giant rattlesnake plantain. It is native to much of North America, particularly in the mountains of the western United States and Canada, from Alaska to northern Mexico, as well as in the Great Lakes region, Maine, Quebec and the Canadian Maritime Provinces.

Goodyera oblongifolia is most commonly found in mountain forests, often in the understory of conifers. This orchid forms a patch of broad lance-shaped to oval-shaped leaves at the ground, each 4 to 9 centimeters long. The leaf is dark green and in this species the midrib is streaked with white. The netlike veining on the leaf is also white, but not as thick as the midrib stripes. The plant produces an erect inflorescence up to about 30 centimeters tall. The top of the inflorescence has many white orchid flowers which may all face the same direction on the stalk, or be spirally arranged about it.

The common name stems from the leaves, which have marks resembling snakeskin; the plant is also said to have been used to treat snakebites.

References

External links 
 Jepson eFlora taxon page
 
 Fire Effects Information System
 Washington Native Orchid Society
 Portland Nursery
 Calflora, California Flora taxon report
 Plants For a Future
 Go Orchids, North American Orchid Conservation Center
 
 E-flora BC, Electronic Atlas of the Flora of British Columbia

oblongifolia
Orchids of North America
Plants described in 1833
Taxa named by Constantine Samuel Rafinesque